Padali is a village in the Karmala taluka of Solapur district in Maharashtra state, India.

Demographics
Covering  and comprising 318 households at the time of the 2011 census of India, Padali had a population of 1529. There were 819 males and 710 females, with 168 people being aged six or younger.

References

Villages in Karmala taluka